Little Creek is a tributary of East Branch Tunkhannock Creek in Susquehanna County, Pennsylvania, in the United States. The creek has one unofficially named tributary, which is known as Tinker Hollow. Little Creek is designated as Class A Wild Trout Waters. The surficial geology in its vicinity mainly consists of Wisconsinan Till and alluvium.

Course
Little Creek begins in a valley in Herrick Township. It flows southwest for a few tenths of a mile, passing through an unnamed pond before turning south-southeast. After more than a mile, the creek receives an unnamed tributary from the left and turns south, entering Clifford Township. Several tenths of a mile further downstream, it turns southwest, receiving the tributary Tinker Hollow from the left before turning northwest, beginning to flow alongside Tinker Hill. After a short distance, the creek turns southwest again for a few tenths of a mile before reaching its confluence with East Branch Tunkhannock Creek.

Tributaries
Little Creek has one unofficially named tributary: Tinker Hollow, which is named for the valley through which it flows.

Hydrology, geography, and geology

The surficial geology along the lower reaches of Little Creek mainly consists of alluvium, though there is a till known as Wisconsinan Till in the surrounding valley. Along the upper reaches of the creek, the surficial geology is mostly Wisconsinan Till.

Watershed
The creek is entirely within the United States Geological Survey quadrangle of Clifford. Its mouth is located near Elkdale.

A pipeline crosses Little Creek in its lower reaches.

History
Little Creek was entered into the Geographic Names Information System on August 2, 1979. Its identifier in the Geographic Names Information System is 1179516.

Biology
Wild trout naturally reproduce in Little Creek from its headwaters downstream to its mouth. Little Creek is classified by the Pennsylvania Fish and Boat Commission as Class A Wild Trout Waters for brook trout.

The drainage basin of Little Creek is designated as a Coldwater Fishery. However, its existing use is Exceptional Value waters.

See also
Tinker Creek (East Branch Tunkhannock Creek), next tributary of East Branch Tunkhannock Creek going downstream
List of rivers of Pennsylvania

References

Rivers of Susquehanna County, Pennsylvania
Tributaries of Tunkhannock Creek
Rivers of Pennsylvania